Warenski is a surname and can refer to:

People  
 Buster Warenski (1942–2005), custom knifemaker 
 Lisa Warenski (born 1970), Salt Lake City-based dancer and choreographer
 Ludwik Tadeusz Waryński (1856–89), Polish socialist

Other  
 Warenski-Duvall Commercial Building and Apartments, Murray, Utah